Tómas Ingi Tómasson (born 7 June 1969) is an Icelandic former football manager and player who played the striker position.

Personal life
Following his retirement from football, Tómas had a failed hip surgery in 2015 which resulted in four further surgeries to fix the problem.

References

External links

1969 births
Living people
Tomas Ingi Tomasson
Tomas Ingi Tomasson
Berliner FC Dynamo players
Tomas Ingi Tomasson
Tomas Ingi Tomasson
Raufoss IL players
Tomas Ingi Tomasson
Aarhus Gymnastikforening players
Association football forwards
Tomas Ingi Tomasson
Expatriate footballers in Germany
Tomas Ingi Tomasson
Expatriate footballers in Norway
Tomas Ingi Tomasson
Expatriate men's footballers in Denmark
Tomas Ingi Tomasson
Tomas Ingi Tomasson